is a railway station in the city of Toyama, Toyama Prefecture, Japan, operated by the private railway operator Toyama Chihō Railway.

Lines

Station layout 
The station has one ground-level side platform serving a single bi-directional track. The station is staffed during weekday mornings only.

History
Fujikoshi Station was opened on 6 December 1914.

Adjacent stations

Passenger statistics
In fiscal 2015, the station was used by 407 passengers daily.

Surrounding area 
 Nachi-Fujikoshi head office

See also
 List of railway stations in Japan

References

External links

 

Railway stations in Toyama Prefecture
Railway stations in Japan opened in 1914
Stations of Toyama Chihō Railway